This article contains information about the literary events and publications of 1775.

Events
January 17 – Richard Brinsley Sheridan's first play, the comedy of manners The Rivals, is premièred at the Covent Garden Theatre in London, then extensively rewritten. It reopens on January 28 to acclaim. The play introduces the character of Mrs. Malaprop.
February 23 – Pierre Beaumarchais' comedy Le Barbier de Séville is premièred by the Comédie-Française at the Tuileries Palace in Paris. Rewritten it reopens on February 26 to better success. It introduces the character of Figaro.
October 19 – Samuel Johnson, Henry Thrale and Hester Thrale, visiting Paris, watch King Louis XVI of France and Queen Marie Antoinette dining.
December 29 – The English actress Sarah Siddons makes her debut at the Drury Lane Theatre in London as Portia in The Merchant of Venice but is poorly received.

New books

Prose
Hester Chapone – Miscellanies
William Combe – Letters from Eliza to Yorick (forgeries supposed to be from Eliza Draper to Laurence Sterne)
Charles Johnstone – The Pilgrim
Samuel Jackson Pratt (as Courtney Melmoth) – Liberal Opinions, upon Animals, Man, and Providence
Moral Tales (anonymous)
Nicolas-Edme Rétif – Le Paysan perverti
Richard Savage – The Works of Richard Savage (Samuel Johnson, editor)
Tahsin (Mir Muhammad Husain 'Ata Khan) – Nau Tarz-e-Murassa (Urdu translation of Amir Khusrow's The Tale of the Four Dervishes)

Drama
Vittorio Alfieri – Cleopatra
Pierre Beaumarchais – Le Barbier de Séville
Thomas Francklin – Matilda
David Garrick – Bon Ton
John Hoole – Cleonice, Princess of Bithynia
Thomas Hull – Edward and Eleonora
Robert Jephson – Braganza
Charlotte Lennox – Old City Manners
Gotthold Lessing – Die Juden
Louis-Sébastien Mercier
La Brouette du vinaigrier
Natalie
Richard Brinsley Sheridan – The Rivals
Ignacio López de Ayala – Numancia destruida

Poetry

Geoffrey Chaucer – The Canterbury Tales of Chaucer (Thomas Tyrwhitt, editor)
George Crabbe – Inebriety
Hugh Downman – The Drama
Thomas Gray – Poems
Edward Jerningham – The Fall of Mexico
Mary Robinson – Poems

Non-fiction
Edmund Burke
Speech on American Taxation, April 19, 1774
Speech on Conciliation with the Colonies, March 22, 1775
Susannah Dobson – Life of Petrarch (drawn from Jacques-François de Sade's Mémoires pour la vie de François Petrarch)
Elizabeth Griffith – The Morality of Shakespeare's Comedy Illustrated
John Howie – Biographia Scoticana
Samuel Johnson
A Journey to the Western Islands of Scotland
Taxation No Tyranny: An Answer to the Resolutions and Address of the American Congress
Henrietta Knight – Letters to William Shenstone
James Macpherson – The History of Great Britain
Honoré Gabriel Riqueti, comte de Mirabeau – Essai sur le despotisme
Joseph Priestley – Hartley's Theory of the Human Mind
Louis Claude de Saint-Martin – Des erreurs et de la vérité
Laurence Sterne (died 1768)
Letters of the Late Rev. Mr. L. Sterne
Sterne's Letters to his Friends on Various Occasions
John Wesley – A Calm Address to Our American Colonies

Births
January 30 – Walter Savage Landor, English poet (died 1864)
February 10 – Charles Lamb, English essayist (died 1834)
February 28 – Sophie Tieck, German poet (died 1833)
May 13 – Henry Crabb Robinson, English man of letters and diarist (died 1867)
June 15 – Elizabeth Benger, English biographer, novelist and poet (died 1827)
July 9 – Matthew Lewis, English novelist and dramatist (died 1818) 
August 2 – William Henry Ireland, English forger of Shakespeariana (died 1835)
September 13 – Mary Rolls, English poet (died 1835)
December 16 – Jane Austen, English novelist (died 1817)

Deaths
January 8 – John Baskerville, English printer and typefounder (born 1707)
January 13 – Johann Georg Walch, German theologian (born 1693)
March 5 – Pierre-Laurent Buirette de Belloy, French dramatist and actor (born 1727)
June 23 – Karl Ludwig von Pöllnitz, German adventurer and writer (born 1692)
November 21 – John Hill, English botanist novelist and dramatist (born c. 1716)
unknown date – Samuel Boyce, English engraver, dramatist and poet (unknown year of birth)

References

 
Years of the 18th century in literature